Eugene Laverne Kunes (November 22, 1908 – May 17, 1965) was an American professional golfer.

Kunes was born in Erie, Pennsylvania. He made his living as a club professional while occasionally playing on the early PGA Tour. He did win three times on Tour, including the 1935  Canadian Open.

Professional wins

PGA Tour wins
1933 one win
1935 Canadian Open, Mid-South Pro-Pro Bestball (with Dick Metz)

Other wins
this list may be incomplete
1931 Connecticut PGA Championship
1933 Connecticut PGA Championship
1934 Philadelphia PGA Championship, East Falls Open
1941 Pennsylvania Open Championship
1942 Philadelphia PGA Championship
1947 Massachusetts Open, New Jersey State Open, New Jersey PGA Championship, Philadelphia Open Championship

Results in major championships

Note: Kunes never played in The Open Championship.

NYF = tournament not yet founded
NT = no tournament
CUT = missed the half-way cut
WD = withdrew
R64, R32, R16, QF, SF = round in which player lost in PGA Championship match play
"T" indicates a tie for a place

Summary

Most consecutive cuts made – 17 (1934 PGA – 1947 U.S. Open)
Longest streak of top-10s – 1 (four times)

References

American male golfers
PGA Tour golfers
Golfers from Pennsylvania
Sportspeople from Erie, Pennsylvania
1908 births
1965 deaths